Kenneth Lo may refer to:

 Kenneth Lo (businessman) (born 1938), Hong Kong businessman
 Kenneth Lo (writer) (1913–1995), British Chinese writer, television chef, and restaurateur
 Ken Lo (born 1957), Hong Kong actor, martial artist, and stuntman
 Kenneth Lo Tak-cheung (1922–2007), Hong Kong lawyer and politician

See also 
 Kenneth Low,  Chinese-Fijian businessman and political leader in Fiji